There are at least 69 named lakes and reservoirs in Woodruff County, Arkansas.

Lakes
 Beard Lake, el.  
 Beaver Lake, el.  
 Big Blue Hole, el.  
 Big Buck Lake, el.  
 Big Elam Lake, el.  
 Big Jack Lake, el.  
 Big Jordan Lake, el.  
 Big York Lake, el.  
 Bird Lake, el.  
 Blue Lake, el.  
 Blue Lake, el.  
 Broom Lake, el.  
 Brushy Lake, el.  
 Brushy Lake, el.  
 Brushy Lake, el.  
 Brushy Lake, el.  
 Buckley Lake, el.  
 Buzzard Lake, el.  
 Chambers Lake, el.  
 Cheatam Lake, el.  
 Clear Lake, el.  
 Crane Lake, el.  
 Dupree Lake, el.  
 Eagle Lake, el.  
 Fish Lake, el.  
 Goose Pond, el.  
 Gregory Lake, el.  
 Hammond Lake, el.  
 Horseshoe Lake, el.  
 Hurricane Lake, el.  
 Hurricane Lake, el.  
 Jackson Lake, el.  
 Jennings Lake, el.  
 Johnson Lake, el.  
 Johnson Lake, el.  
 King Lake, el.  
 Little Blue Hole, el.  
 Little Buck Lake, el.  
 Little Clear Lake, el.  
 Little Elam Lake, el.  
 Little Jack Lake, el.  
 Little Jordan Lake, el.  
 Little Reddon Lake, el.  
 Little York Lake, el.  
 Log Lake, el.  
 Long Lake, el.  
 Lost Lake, el.  
 Lost Lake, el.  
 Lower Seibert Lake, el.  
 Mill Lake, el.  
 Morrison Lake, el.  
 Mud Lake, el.  
 Polly Ann Lake, el.  
 Reddon Lake, el.  
 Robinson Lake, el.  
 Sevenmile Lake, el.  
 Spivey Lake, el.  
 Straight Lake, el.  
 Straight Lake, el.  
 Straight Lake, el.  
 Sullivan Lake, el.  
 Teague Lake, el.  
 Three Prong Lake, el.  
 Turtle Lake, el.  
 Upper Seibert Lake, el.  
 Walker Lake, el.  
 White Lake, el.  
 White Lake, el.  
 Yancopin Lake, el.

Reservoirs
According to the United States Geological Survey, there are no named reservoirs in Newton County, Arkansas.

See also
 List of lakes in Arkansas

Notes

Woodruff
Geography of Woodruff County, Arkansas
Arkansas-related lists